The Men's 20 km Race Walk at the 1980 Summer Olympics in Moscow, USSR had an entry list of 34 competitors. Seven athletes were disqualified and two did not finish in the final, which was held on Thursday, 24 July 1980.

The race occurred on a very hot and humid day in the Grand Arena of Central Lenin Stadium. The defending champion of the Montreal summer games, Daniel Bautista of Mexico, led along with Soviet Anatoly Solomin for the majority of the race. However, Bautista was disqualified less than two kilometres from the finish and Solomin a few 100 metres later. There were a total of 136 caution flags and seven disqualifications during the course of the race.

In what was considered a major upset, Maurizio Damilano of Italy won the gold with a finishing time of 1-23:35.5, over a minute faster than silver medalist Pyotr Pochinchuk of Belarus, competing for the USSR. Roland Wieser took the bronze for East Germany, the country with the second highest medal total at these Olympics after the USSR.

Also notable was the 18-year-old 25th place finisher, Thipsamay Chanthaphone, who was competing for Laos in its first Olympic appearance. Chanthaphone  completed the 20 kilometres in 2:20:22.0, finishing during the medal ceremony almost 57 minutes after Damilano's win and 31 minutes after 24th place.

Medalists

Results

See also
 1982 Men's European Championships 20 km Walk (Athens)
 1983 Men's World Championships 20 km Walk (Helsinki)
 1986 Men's European Championships 20 km Walk (Stuttgart)

References

External links
  Results

 1
Racewalking at the Olympics
Men's events at the 1980 Summer Olympics